The 2021 Asia Rugby Women's Sevens Series was hosted as two tournament events in the United Arab Emirates in late November 2021. Following the cancellation of the 2020 series due to impacts of the COVID-19 pandemic, it was the twelfth edition of Asia's continental sevens circuit. The first leg of the tournament was a qualifier for the 2022 Rugby World Cup Sevens in South Africa. Japan and China qualified for the World Cup.

The lower-tier Trophy tournaments, hosted in Lebanon, Uzbekistan and Thailand served as qualifiers, with the winners eligible to compete in the main series.

Teams 
8 teams competed in the main series.

Schedule

Incheon, Huizhou and Colombo were originally scheduled as legs of the 2021 series, but all were eventually cancelled due to impacts of the COVID-19 pandemic and replaced by two events in the United Arab Emirates. The official schedule for the 2021 Asia Rugby Women's Sevens Series is:

Standings

Tournaments

Dubai 
The Tournament was held from the 19 to 20 November in Dubai.

Pool stage

Knockout stage 
Plate

Cup

Trophy
The women's trophy events were supposed to be held in three places. The Trophy events scheduled for Central and South Asia, and, East and South East Asia appear to have been cancelled.

Trophy West Asia 

Round-robin

Round 1      

Round 2      

Round 3      

Round 4      

Round 5

See also
 2021 Asia Rugby Sevens Series (for men)

References

Asia Rugby Women's Sevens Series
Asia Rugby Women's Sevens
2021 rugby sevens competitions
2021 in Asian rugby union
2021 in Emirati sport
Asia Rugby Women's Sevens
Sports competitions in Dubai